The Red Sea–Dead Sea Access is a series of highway construction projects intended to bring easy transportation and prosperity to Jordan, Israel, Palestine and the surrounding area.

Construction

The Agreement 

An agreement was signed in Amman on October 24, 1974, between the Retired Servicemen Engineering Agency (RSEA) of Taiwan and the Jordanian government, under which a new "road to friendship" will be built in the southern part of the Hashemite Kingdom. Yen Hsiao-chang, RSEA director, and Ahmad Shobaki, Jordanian minister of public works, signed the agreement for the construction of the  highway.

Under the agreement, RSEA will build the highway in 30 months. Construction will start in three months. Carrying a price tag of US$14 million, the highway will open up new horizons in industrial and agricultural development in southern Jordan.

Preparation 

 of sand dune was opened for the critical area of the road within three months. To expedite the program, engineering expertise from surveying to embankment were brought in from Taiwan as well. More than 150 pieces of equipment were used, including three Wabco 555 self-elevating scrapers, 10 Caterpillar bulldozers, 10 HINO dumping trucks, loaders, graders, water tanks, vibrating compactors and roller compactors, etc.

Safi-Aqaba Highway 

The Safi-Aqaba Highway is a highway at Jordan side of the Jordan–Israel border. Totaling  in length, it connects Safi, the south end of Dead Sea to Aqaba, the north point of Red Sea. RSEA started the project in 1974 and finished it 1977.

Lo Chien-Ning, chief engineer, was assigned to oversee the engineering. All engineers, mechanics, operators—74 expatriates—were selected from RSEA's job site at Taiwan (ROC), Africa, Saudi Arabia and Thailand. There are also over 200 local operators, laborers from Jordan, Egypt, Palestine, Syria, Yemen, etc. The working schedule should follow Muslim's custom regarding the warship bell and festival of Ramadan and Hajj.

There was rarely life of animals and plants along the construction route. During the construction, the engineering group and equipment were moved in from Aqaba to form a new town in the desert, the lowest place in the world.

Lin Chi-Ko, manager of Jordan Project Office of RSEA, contacted Israel patrol at the fence and told them the fence need to be moved to meet the highway design. After the fence was moved, the surveyors continued to work through. And it was only safe to conduct construction within  of the centerline of the alignment. Unfortunately, on June 17, 1975, an accident happened. The leader of surveying team of Jordan Public Works, along with two technicians and a driver were killed by a mine.

"The Pavilion of Friendship", a landmark and symbol for the highway, was built as a present by Taiwan to Jordan. Even though the diplomatic relation was terminated eventually, the people from two countries continued working together to finish building the highway.

Project passes over Wadi Arabah 
RSEA started the project in 1978 and finished it in 1979. During that time, RSEA also provided the equipment in the desert to Hyundai Engineering & Construction for housing units and to M&K Construction Company for Arab Potash Company projects.

Suweima-Zara Highway,  in length, was built north of Mazra'a. RSEA started the project in 1979 and finished it in 1981. There is a gap along the Dead Sea between Mazra'a and Sweima. And the Camp of Sweima was set face to face with the golden dome of Jerusalem across the Dead Sea.

Incomplete section by the Dead Sea 
There was an incomplete section from Mazra'a to Zara. The highway can range from a dirt road to a pavement and is intended to facilitate access by the Dead Sea. But the impact of the project was a dominant concern. Environment control, natural resource development, transportation facilities, tunnels, bridges and other structures are all among the factors taken into consideration. And it was decided that the project would be too expensive.

Completion 
Later, the highway was constructed nevertheless as part of Jordan's 25-year plan to build an extensive road network which travels around the country. As of today, Highway 65 reaches far north in Jordan.

Two Seas Canal 
The connection of the seas by canal was suggested in the mid 19th century by British officers who were thinking how to circumvent the Suez Canal. One of those planners was the Zionist leader Hertzel. The Red Sea Dead Sea conduit was proposed in the end of the 1960s and was analyzed as part of the peace process between Israel and Jordan.

On May 9, 2005, Jordan, Israel and the Palestinian Authority signed an agreement to go ahead with a feasibility study for the Two Seas Canal. The agreement was signed on the Dead Sea by Jordanian Water Minister Raed Abu Soud, Israeli Infrastructure Minister Binyamin Ben-Eliezer and Palestinian Planning Minister Ghassan al-Khatib.

In August 2013, Jordanian government announced that it would move ahead with the first phase of the project. On December 9, 2013, an agreement to build the pipeline was signed by Israel, Jordan and Palestine.

See also 

Highway 65
Mediterranean–Dead Sea Canal
Red Sea–Dead Sea Water Conveyance

References

External links 
Retired Servicemen Engineering Agency's Overseas Projects
Taiwan Review's report on the contract signing
Dead Sea Highway Photo Gallery by Brian McMorrow

Dead Sea
Road construction
Transport in Jordan